Esanthelphusa nimoafi is a species of crab of the family Gecarcinucidae. The crab is native to Laos.

References

Crustaceans described in 2004
Fauna of Laos
Gecarcinucidae